John Flett may refer to:

 John Flett (geologist) (1869–1947), Scottish physician and geologist
 John Flett (rugby union) ((born 1963), Australian rugby union player
 John Flett (fashion designer) (1963–1991), British fashion designer
 Jack Flett (John Flett, 1871–1932), Canadian lacrosse player